The Waterpocket Fold is a geologic landform that extends from southern Wayne through  Garfield and ending in northern Kane counties of southern Utah, United States. The geologic structure, formed during the Laramide orogeny, is a south-southeast trending fold in which the east side is dropped relative to the west side. The structure defines the Capitol Reef National Park in southern Utah.

The feature can be observed in three scenic routes in the park. The park's Scenic Drive leads to a famous landmark known as the Golden Throne. Utah State Route 24 crosses the fold east of Fruita. Notom Road runs south through Notom and runs parallel to the east (downdropped) side of the structure to its intersection with Utah State Route 276 just north of Lake Powell. The southern end of the structure extends to the Colorado River just southwest of Halls Crossing.

See also
Geology of the Capitol Reef area

References

External links
 
Photo gallery of the Fold
Geologic Maps and Images of the Waterpocket Fold, Remote sensing tutorial at USGS

Capitol Reef National Park
Landforms of Garfield County, Utah
Landforms of Kane County, Utah
Landforms of Wayne County, Utah
Geology of Utah